Mutineers of the Bounty, translated in English by English writer W. H. G. Kingston, is a short story by Jules Verne.  The story is based on British documents about the Mutiny on the Bounty and was published in 1879 together with the novel The Begum's Fortune (Les cinq cents millions de la Bégum), as a part of the series Les Voyages Extraordinaires (The Extraordinary Voyages). 

Unlike many authors covering the topic, Verne concentrates on the deposed captain of the Bounty, William Bligh.  After mutineers forced Bligh into the Bounty's 23-foot launch on 28 April 1789, he led loyal crew members on a 6,710 kilometer journey to safety, reaching Timor 47 days later.

The original text was written by Gabriel Marcel (1843–1909), a geographer from the National Library of France. Jules Verne’s work was proofreading. Verne supposedly bought the rights to the text for 300 francs, but it had not been verified.

References

External links

 Original illustrations by S. Drée
 Les Révoltés de la Bounty available at Jules Verne Collection 

1879 short stories
Short stories by Jules Verne
HMS Bounty in fiction